Jack Newton (1950–2022) was an Australian golfer.

Jack Newton may also refer to:

Jack Newton (Toronto politician), Toronto politician
Jack B. Newton (born 1942), Canadian astronomer
John Verdun Newton (1916–1944), military aviator and politician in Western Australia
Jack Newton (footballer) (born 1952), Australian rules footballer

See also
John Newton (disambiguation)